Yanfu Temple, more commonly known as Prince Temple, is a Buddhist temple located in Alxa Left Banner, Alxa League, Inner Mongolia China. Yanfu Temple is considered one of the Three Great Buddhist Temples in Alxa League, alongside Fuyin Temple and Guangzong Temple.

History

The temple was first established in 1731, in the 9th year of Yongzheng period in the Qing dynasty (1644–1911). The Mahavira Hall was added to the temple between 1737 and 1739 by Prince Luobozangduoerji. In 1760, Qianlong Emperor inscribed and honored the name "Yanfu Temple". In 1805, Prince Mahabala erected the Agaba Hall, Guanyin Hall, Dalike Temple and renovated the Jingang Hall and Bhaisajyaguru Hall.

In 1932, Prince Dalizhaya ordered to repair the Mahavira Hall.

During the ten-year Cultural Revolution the Red Guards attacked the temple, halls, statues and other works of art were either removed, damaged or destroyed in the massive socialist movement.

After the 3rd Plenary Session of the 11th Central Committee of the Communist Party of China, the policy of religious freedom was implemented. Yanfu Temple reactivated its religious activities. As of 2012, the temple had over 40 halls and rooms and more than 40 lamas.

On 10 May 1986, the temple was inscribed to the Second Inner Mongolia Cultural Heritage List.

In 2006, it was listed among the sixth batch of "Major National Historical and Cultural Sites in Inner Mongolia" by the State Council of China.

Architecture
Now the existing main buildings include the Sutra Hall, Hall of Bodhisattva, Hall of Four Heavenly Kings, Hall of Sakyamuni, Hall of Bhaisajyaguru, Vajrayana Hall, Bell tower, Drum tower, etc.

References

Tibetan Buddhist temples in Inner Mongolia
Gelug monasteries and temples
Buddhist temples in Alxa League
Buildings and structures in Alxa League
Tourist attractions in Alxa League
1731 establishments in China
18th-century Buddhist temples
Religious buildings and structures completed in 1731
Major National Historical and Cultural Sites in Inner Mongolia